The 2015 Buffalo Bills season was the franchise’s 56th overall season as a football team, 46th in the National Football League, third under leadership of general manager Doug Whaley and first under new head coach Rex Ryan. It was also the first full season under the ownership of Terry and Kim Pegula (who also own the Buffalo Sabres), having purchased the Bills partway through 2014 after the death of longtime owner Ralph Wilson in March at the age of 95.

The Bills began their season with an open competition for the starting quarterback position after Kyle Orton, the starter for most of the 2014 campaign, retired during the offseason, so the team acquired free agent Tyrod Taylor, a former backup quarterback of the Baltimore Ravens, who won the competition over incumbent second-string quarterback EJ Manuel and trade acquisition Matt Cassel, the latter of whom the team later traded along with a seventh-round pick in 2017 to the Dallas Cowboys, in exchange for a fifth-round draft pick in 2017.

Despite Ryan's bold prediction of the Bills making the playoffs at his introductory press conference, the Bills were unable to do so in their first season with Ryan as head coach, finishing with a record of 8-8 (the team’s first since 2002), making it the 16th straight season without a playoff appearance, which became the longest active in major professional sports after Major League Baseball’s Toronto Blue Jays broke their 22-year playoff drought on September 25, 2015.

Offseason
The Bills made headlines when they hired a new head coach in Rex Ryan, who signed a five-year, $27.5 million contract on January 12, 2015 after having previously spent the past six seasons coaching the division-rival New York Jets. Ryan had led the Jets to two straight AFC Championship games in 2009 and 2010 before his firing in 2014. He became the 18th head coach in Bills history and the fifth in the past seven years in the process. Ryan replaced Doug Marrone, who opted out of his contract on December 31, 2014 in order to take advantage of a contract loophole.

Roster changes

Signings

Free agents lost

Trades

Draft

Notes
 The Bills did not have a selection in the first-round or fourth-round as a result of a trade that sent their 2014 first-round selection (19th overall), later revealed to be Ja’Wuan James, to the Miami Dolphins, fourth-round selection (115th overall), later revealed to be Shaquelle Evans, to the New York Jets and their first-round selection (9th overall), later revealed to be Anthony Barr, to the Cleveland Browns in a three-team trade that sent the Browns’ 2014 first-round selection (4th overall), later revealed to be Sammy Watkins, to Buffalo. The Bills acquired a fourth-round selection (113th overall), later revealed to be Gabe Wright, in a trade that sent Stevie Johnson to the San Francisco 49ers. The Bills later traded this selection to the Philadelphia Eagles in exchange for Bryce Brown. The Bills acquired a fifth-round selection (137th overall), later revealed to be Grady Jarrett, as part of a trade that sent their 2014 seventh-round selection (221st overall), later revealed to be Randell Johnson, to the Tampa Bay Buccaneers. The Bills later traded this selection and their 2016 seventh-round selection (240th overall), later revealed to be Alex McCalister, to the Vikings in exchange for Matt Cassel and the Vikings’ 2015 sixth-round selection (188th overall), later revealed to be Tony Steward.

Staff

Final roster

Schedule

Preseason

Regular season

Note: Intra-division opponents are in bold text.

Game summaries

Week 1: vs. Indianapolis Colts

The Bills franchise reached the 400th career win in its history with a 27-14 win over the Colts.  Running backs Karlos Williams, LeSean McCoy and quarterback Tyrod Taylor combined for 137 rushing yards and a touchdown (Anthony Dixon added another on the ground) and Taylor completed 14/19 for 195 yards and a touchdown.  Colts quarterback Andrew Luck had two touchdowns, but he was intercepted and sacked twice.

Week 2: vs. New England Patriots

With the close loss, the Bills dropped to 1-1. As if the loss wasn’t bad enough, the team also lost safety Aaron Williams for the season with a neck injury sustained trying to keep Patriots tight end Rob Gronkowski from reaching the end zone.

Week 3: at Miami Dolphins

After leading 27-0, Dolphins quarterback Ryan Tannehill finally threw two touchdowns, but his three interceptions, one of which a pick-six returned by linebacker Preston Brown 43 yards for a touchdown, proved to be too much as the Bills improved to 2-1.

Week 4: vs. New York Giants

With their third straight loss to the Giants dating back to 2007, the Bills dropped to 2-2.

Week 5: at Tennessee Titans

With the win, the Bills improved to 3-2.

Week 6: vs. Cincinnati Bengals

With their third straight loss to the Bengals dating back to 2011, the Bills dropped to 3-3.

Week 7: at Jacksonville Jaguars

NFL International Series

This was the Bills’ first game in London since 1991. Sadly, with the stunning loss, the Bills dropped to 3-4 heading into the bye week, marking the first time they had been under .500 all season.

Week 9: vs. Miami Dolphins

With the win, not only did the Bills improve to 4-4, but they swept Miami for the first time since 2013.

Week 10: at New York Jets

Rex Ryan made his return to MetLife Stadium for the first time since the Jets fired him after the 2014 season. The Bills wore their red Nike “color rush” uniforms. With 0:18 remaining, Jets quarterback Ryan Fitzpatrick attempted a comeback, but a game-saving interception by Bills safety Bacarri Rambo sealed the 22-17 victory over the Jets. With the win, the Bills improved to 5-4.

This was the debut for NFL Color Rush uniforms, with the Bills in all red and the Jets in all kelly green. The uniforms were indistinguishable to those with red-green color blindness, creating controversy.

Week 11: at New England Patriots

With yet another close loss, the Bills dropped to 5-5.

Week 12: at Kansas City Chiefs

With the loss, the Bills dropped to 5-6.

Week 13: vs. Houston Texans

With the win, not only did the Bills improve to 6-6, they remained in the wild card race. It’s also the Bills first win against the Texans since 2006.

Week 14: at Philadelphia Eagles

LeSean McCoy made his return to Philadelphia for the first time since the Eagles traded him in the offseason. McCoy was seen kissing the Eagles logo, but did not stick around to interact with his former teammates or coach Chip Kelly.

Week 15: at Washington Redskins

With the loss, not only did the Bills drop to 6-8, but they were officially eliminated from playoff contention for the 16th consecutive season.

Week 16: vs. Dallas Cowboys

With the win, the Bills improved to 7-8 heading into the season finale.

Week 17: vs. New York Jets

Prior to the game, the team called for paid volunteers to help shovel snow out of Ralph Wilson Stadium. Former Bills quarterback Ryan Fitzpatrick made his first return to Buffalo since being cut after the 2012 season, hoping to clinch a playoff spot for his new team with a win. Despite the Jets setting various team records, the Bills ultimately pulled out a win to close the season at 8-8 for the first time since 2002 in their final regular season game before Ralph Wilson Stadium was renamed New Era Field the following summer, not only keeping the Jets out of the playoffs for a fifth straight year, but helping the Pittsburgh Steelers reach the playoffs. As a thank you gift of sorts, the Steelers sent the Bills a care package of Primanti Brothers sandwiches.

Standings

Division

Conference

References

External links
 

Buffalo
Buffalo Bills seasons
Buffalo Bills